In astrodynamics, the orbital eccentricity of an astronomical object is a dimensionless parameter that determines the amount by which its orbit around another body deviates from a perfect circle. A value of 0 is a circular orbit, values between 0 and 1 form an elliptic orbit, 1 is a parabolic escape orbit (or capture orbit), and greater than 1 is a hyperbola. The term derives its name from the parameters of conic sections, as every Kepler orbit is a conic section. It is normally used for the isolated two-body problem, but extensions exist for objects following a rosette orbit through the Galaxy.

Definition
In a two-body problem with inverse-square-law force, every orbit is a Kepler orbit. The eccentricity of this Kepler orbit is a non-negative number that defines its shape.

The eccentricity may take the following values:
 circular orbit: e = 0
 elliptic orbit: 0 < e < 1
 parabolic trajectory: e = 1
 hyperbolic trajectory: e > 1

The eccentricity e is given by

where  is the total orbital energy,  is the angular momentum,  is the reduced mass, and  the coefficient of the inverse-square law central force such as in the theory of gravity or electrostatics in classical physics:

( is negative for an attractive force, positive for a repulsive one; related to the Kepler problem)

or in the case of a gravitational force:

where  is the specific orbital energy (total energy divided by the reduced mass),  the standard gravitational parameter based on the total mass, and  the specific relative angular momentum (angular momentum divided by the reduced mass).

Here, the total turn is analogous to turning number, but for open curves (an angle covered by velocity vector). The limit case between an ellipse and a hyperbola, when e equals 1, is parabola.

Radial trajectories are classified as elliptic, parabolic, or hyperbolic based on the energy of the orbit, not the eccentricity. Radial orbits have zero angular momentum and hence eccentricity equal to one. Keeping the energy constant and reducing the angular momentum, elliptic, parabolic, and hyperbolic orbits each tend to the corresponding type of radial trajectory while e tends to 1 (or in the parabolic case, remains 1).

For a repulsive force only the hyperbolic trajectory, including the radial version, is applicable.

For elliptical orbits, a simple proof shows that  yields the projection angle of a perfect circle to an ellipse of eccentricity e.  For example, to view the eccentricity of the planet Mercury (e = 0.2056), one must simply calculate the inverse sine to find the projection angle of 11.86 degrees.  Then, tilting any circular object by that angle, the apparent ellipse of that object projected to the viewer's eye will be of the same eccentricity.

Etymology
The word "eccentricity" comes from Medieval Latin eccentricus, derived from Greek  ekkentros "out of the center", from  ek-, "out of" +  kentron "center". "Eccentric" first appeared in English in 1551, with the definition "...a circle in which the earth, sun. etc. deviates from its center". In 1556, five years later, an adjectival form of the word had developed.

Calculation
The eccentricity of an orbit can be calculated from the orbital state vectors as the magnitude of the eccentricity vector:

where:
  is the eccentricity vector ("Hamilton's vector").

For elliptical orbits it can also be calculated from the periapsis and apoapsis since  and  where    is the length of the semi-major axis, 

where:
  is the radius at apoapsis (also "apofocus", "aphelion", "apogee"), i.e., the farthest distance of the orbit to the center of mass of the system, which is a focus of the ellipse.
  is the radius at periapsis (or "perifocus" etc.), the closest distance.

The eccentricity of an elliptical orbit can also be used to obtain the ratio of the apoapsis radius to the periapsis radius:

For Earth, orbital eccentricity  apoapsis is aphelion and periapsis is perihelion, relative to the Sun.

For Earth's annual orbit path, the ratio of longest radius / shortest radius is

Examples

Venus and Neptune have even lower eccentricities.

The table lists the values for all planets and dwarf planets, and selected asteroids, comets, and moons. Mercury has the greatest orbital eccentricity of any planet in the Solar System (e = ). Such eccentricity is sufficient for Mercury to receive twice as much solar irradiation at perihelion compared to aphelion. Before its demotion from planet status in 2006, Pluto was considered to be the planet with the most eccentric orbit (e = 0.248). Other Trans-Neptunian objects have significant eccentricity, notably the dwarf planet Eris (0.44). Even further out, Sedna, has an extremely-high eccentricity of  due to its estimated aphelion of 937 AU and perihelion of about 76 AU.

Most of the Solar System's asteroids have orbital eccentricities between 0 and 0.35 with an average value of 0.17. Their comparatively high eccentricities are probably due to the influence of Jupiter and to past collisions.

The four Galilean moons have an eccentricity of less than 0.01. However, smaller moons, particularly irregular moons, can have significant eccentricity, such as Neptune's third largest moon Nereid (0.75).

Comets have very different values of eccentricity. Periodic comets have eccentricities mostly between 0.2 and 0.7, but some of them have highly eccentric elliptical orbits with eccentricities just below 1; for example, Halley's Comet has a value of 0.967. Non-periodic comets follow near-parabolic orbits and thus have eccentricities even closer to 1. As Hale–Bopp's value is less than 1, its orbit is elliptical and it will return. Comet McNaught has a hyperbolic orbit while within the influence of the planets, but is still bound to the Sun with an orbital period of about 105 years. Comet C/1980 E1 has the largest eccentricity of any known hyperbolic comet of solar origin with an eccentricity of 1.057, and will eventually leave the Solar System.

ʻOumuamua is the first interstellar object found passing through the Solar System. Its orbital eccentricity of 1.20 indicates that ʻOumuamua has never been gravitationally bound to the Sun. It was discovered 0.2 AU ( km;  mi) from Earth and is roughly 200 meters in diameter. It has an interstellar speed (velocity at infinity) of 26.33 km/s ( mph).

Mean eccentricity
The mean eccentricity of an object is the average eccentricity as a result of perturbations over a given time period.

Climatic effect
Orbital mechanics require that the duration of the seasons be proportional to the area of Earth's orbit swept between the solstices and equinoxes, so when the orbital eccentricity is extreme, the seasons that occur on the far side of the orbit (aphelion) can be substantially longer in duration. Northern hemisphere autumn and winter occur at closest approach (perihelion), when Earth is moving at its maximum velocity—while the opposite occurs in the southern hemisphere. As a result, in the northern hemisphere, autumn and winter are slightly shorter than spring and summer—but in global terms this is balanced with them being longer below the equator.  In 2006, the northern hemisphere summer was 4.66 days longer than winter, and spring was 2.9 days longer than autumn due to the Milankovitch cycles.

Apsidal precession also slowly changes the place in Earth's orbit where the solstices and equinoxes occur. This is a slow change in the orbit of Earth, not the axis of rotation, which is referred to as axial precession. Over the next  years, the northern hemisphere winters will become gradually longer and summers will become shorter. However, any cooling effect in one hemisphere is balanced by warming in the other, and any overall change will be counteracted by the fact that the eccentricity of Earth's orbit will be almost halved. This will reduce the mean orbital radius and raise temperatures in both hemispheres closer to the mid-interglacial peak.

Exoplanets
Of the many exoplanets discovered, most have a higher orbital eccentricity than planets in the Solar System.  Exoplanets found with low orbital eccentricity (near-circular orbits) are very close to their star and are tidally-locked to the star. All eight planets in the Solar System have near-circular orbits.  The exoplanets discovered show that the Solar System, with its unusually-low eccentricity, is rare and unique. One theory attributes this low eccentricity to the high number of planets in the Solar System; another suggests it arose because of its unique asteroid belts. A few other multiplanetary systems have been found, but none resemble the Solar System. The Solar System has unique planetesimal systems, which led the planets to have near-circular orbits. Solar planetesimal systems include the asteroid belt, Hilda family, Kuiper belt, Hills cloud, and the Oort cloud. The exoplanet systems discovered have either no planetesimal systems or one very large one. Low eccentricity is needed for habitability, especially advanced life. High multiplicity planet systems are much more likely to have habitable exoplanets. The grand tack hypothesis of the Solar System also helps understand its near-circular orbits and other unique features.

See also
 Equation of time

Footnotes

References

Further reading

External links
 World of Physics: Eccentricity
 The NOAA page on Climate Forcing Data includes (calculated) data from Berger (1978), Berger and Loutre (1991). Laskar et al. (2004) on Earth orbital variations, Includes eccentricity over the last 50 million years and for the coming 20 million years.
 The orbital simulations by Varadi, Ghil and Runnegar (2003) provides series for Earth orbital eccentricity and orbital inclination.
 Kepler's Second law's simulation

Orbits